Charaxes zelica, the zelica untailed charaxes, is a butterfly in the family Nymphalidae. It is found in Guinea, Ivory Coast, Ghana, Nigeria, Cameroon, Gabon, the Republic of the Congo, the Central African Republic, the Democratic Republic of the Congo, Angola, Sudan, Uganda, Kenya, Tanzania and possibly Sierra Leone.

Adult males feed on otter and bird droppings and both sexes are attracted to fermented fruit.

The larvae feed on Pterocarpus santalinoides, Paullinia pinnata, Albizia zygia, Lonchocarpus cyanescens, Dalbergia, Millettia, Dichapetalum and Trachyphrynium species.

Description

Original description:

Descriptions are also provided van Someren.

Differs from the related Charaxes lycurgus  in the straighter hindwing distal border

Subspecies
C. z. zelica (Guinea, Sierra Leone, Ivory Coast, Ghana, western Nigeria)
C. z. depuncta Joicey & Talbot, 1921 (southern Sudan, Uganda, western Kenya)
C. z. rougeoti Plantrou, 1978 (eastern Nigeria, Cameroon, Gabon, Congo, Central African Republic, Democratic Republic of the Congo, northern Angola)
C. z. toyoshimai Carcasson, 1964 (north-western Tanzania)

Taxonomy
Charaxes zelica is a member of the species group Charaxes lycurgus.
The supposed clade members are:

Clade 1
Charaxes lycurgus - nominate
Charaxes porthos
Charaxes zelica

Clade 2
Charaxes mycerina
Charaxes doubledayi

References

Victor Gurney Logan Van Someren, 1974 Revisional notes on African Charaxes (Lepidoptera: Nymphalidae). Part IX. Bulletin of the British Museum of Natural History (Entomology) 29 (8):415-487. 
Seitz, A. Die Gross-Schmetterlinge der Erde 13: Die Afrikanischen Tagfalter. Plate XIII 32

External links
Images of C. z. zelica Royal Museum for Central Africa (Albertine Rift Project)
Images of C. z. rougeoti (Albertine Rift Project)
Images at Bold C. z. depuncta one verso (underside)
Bold images of C. z. rougeoti
Bold images of C. z. zelica
Charaxes zelica on Butterflies of Africa

Butterflies described in 1869
Butterflies of Africa
zelica
Taxa named by Arthur Gardiner Butler